Rafael "Lito" Barrientos (1919 – 2 August 2008) was founder of the “Orquesta Internacional de Lito Barrientos”. He was born in Armenia, Sonsonate Department, El Salvador.

The Orchestra "Lito Barrientos" is known, among other songs, for one of the most famous cumbias of all time, “Cumbia en do menor".

In 2007 he was named "Hijo Meritísimo of San Salvador" ("Most meritorious son of El Salvador"). The orchestra received his award at an event in the park of Colonia Montserrat, his place of residence. Moreover, at this same time the park was renamed after him.

Other awards he received during his career were the  "Congo de Oro", in Barranquilla, Colombia; "Ingenio 2006", National Center of Registries (CNR), and “The Order of José Matías Delgado” 

He composed such songs as "Son guanaco" and ""Pájaro picón".

"Lito" was an outstanding musician, cumbia composer, and promoter of costumbrista folklore in the country.

The first contact he had with music was in the choir of his home town, Armenia, about 300 meters from their house.

He was a trader and while the marimba performer in the group Alma India, which joined when he was invited because he recognized as a brother of Leopoldo Barrientos, who was already famous in their execution.

Sononate learned in trombone performance, thanks to their participation in the banda Rafael Alvarez Monchez.

Its success was developed from the 40s, being a contemporary of the great orchestras such as the Glenn Miller. Although she was a teacher in various instruments, his specialty was the trombone.

Honored with his name on a street in his hometown, Armenia, Sonsonate, and a park in Cologne City, Barrientos gave great contribution to the musical culture of El Salvador.

His life led him then to Costa Rica, Panama, Colombia and other regions of Central America. When he founded his orchestra debut in San Salvador in El Salvador the Casino, opposite corner of the Park Districts. Over time the lead reached total. On the radio was a weekly one hour. In the parties charged with one hundred fifty pesos, depending on the place where a good pair of shoes cost two pesos. The orchestra accompanied Tongolele to Lucho Gatica to Muñíz to Churumbeles of Spain.

In one of his trips to the factory recorded with Colombia Barranquilla Burbuja Tropical and pepper. That was a gunshot. He also recorded for Discos Fuentes Medellin item Very, very, well, by Antonio Fuentes and another tremendous success in Colombia, Peru, Ecuador, Venezuela, Mexico and United States. That was the biggest success you had.

He was also founder of the General Union of Artists-Salvadoreños (UGASAL); the Society of Authors, Composers, and Interpreters (SACIM); and owner of the label Discolito.

Sononate learned in trombone performance, thanks to their participation in the banda Rafael Alvarez Monchez.

Barrientos died of Parkinson's disease at his home in Montserrat, El Salvador, on 2 August 2008.
In memory of Don Lito Barrientos hung in the Media Center "Cumbia in C minor" one of the songs with which conquered El Salvador. He was survived by his wife, Dona Rosita de Barrientos, who was with him to the end.

References

 "Muere el músico Lito Barrientos", Muere el músico Lito Barrientos, August 2008. Accessed April 5, 2009.
 "Lito Barrientos, In Memoriam" Lito Barrientos, In Memoriam, August 2008. Accessed April 5, 2009.
  LITO BARRIENTOS (MUSICO Y COMPOSITOR) "HOMENAJE POSTUMO" - Check out the "more info" tab, August 2008. Accessed April 5, 2009.

Salvadoran musicians
Recipients of the Order of José Matías Delgado
1919 births
2008 deaths
Salvadoran expatriates in Costa Rica
Salvadoran expatriates in Panama
Salvadoran expatriates in Colombia